Sychyovo is a rural locality (a village) in Novoselskoye Rural Settlement, Kovrovsky District, Vladimir Oblast, Russia. The population was 12 as of 2010.

Geography 
Sychyovo is located 14 km southwest of Kovrov (the district's administrative centre) by road. Belkovo is the nearest rural locality.

References 

Rural localities in Kovrovsky District